Tukhtasunov is a surname. Notable people with the surname include:

 Daler Tukhtasunov (born 1986), Tajikistani footballer
 Davronjon Tukhtasunov (born 1990), Tajikistani footballer

Tajik-language surnames